Nigel Graham Costello (born 22 November 1968) is an English former professional footballer who played as a winger in the Football League for York City, and in non-League football for York Railway Institute, Bridlington Town, Pontefract Collieries, Nestlé Rowntree and Selby Town.

References

1968 births
Living people
People from Catterick, North Yorkshire
English footballers
Association football wingers
York City F.C. players
York Railway Institute A.F.C. players
Bridlington Town A.F.C. players
Pontefract Collieries F.C. players
Nestlé Rowntree F.C. players
Selby Town F.C. players
English Football League players